Kupros is a rural locality (a selo) and the administrative center of Kuprosskoye Rural Settlement, Yusvinsky District, Perm Krai, Russia. The population was 475 as of 2010. There are 18 streets.

Geography 
Kupros is located 37 km east of Yusva (the district's administrative centre) by road. Kuzmino is the nearest rural locality.

References 

Rural localities in Yusvinsky District